Éric Dandenault (born March 10, 1970) is a Canadian former professional ice hockey player who played in the American Hockey League (AHL), International Hockey League (IHL), and Deutsche Eishockey Liga (DEL). He signed a three-year contract as an undrafted free agent with the Philadelphia Flyers and started his pro career in 1991 with their AHL affiliate, the Hershey Bears. He was the head coach of the Windsor Wild in the Ligue Nord-Américaine de Hockey (LNAH).

References

External links

1970 births
Living people
Augsburger Panther players
Berlin Capitals players
Canadian ice hockey defencemen
Canadian expatriate ice hockey players in the United States
Chicoutimi Saguenéens (QMJHL) players
Cincinnati Cyclones (IHL) players
DEG Metro Stars players
Drummondville Voltigeurs players
French Quebecers
Geleen Smoke Eaters players
Hershey Bears players
Ice hockey people from Quebec
Johnstown Chiefs players
Montreal Roadrunners players
Saginaw Wheels players
SHC Fassa players
Sportspeople from Sherbrooke